The Illinois State Redbirds women's basketball team represents Illinois State University, located in Normal, Illinois, in NCAA Division I basketball competition.

History
Illinois State began play in 1971. As of the end of 2015–16 season, the Redbirds have an all-time record of 721–587.

They have:

 Made the NCAA tournament in 1983, 1985, 1989, 2005, 2008 and 2022.
 Made the WNIT in 1980, 1982, 1984, 1988, 1990, 1996, 2007, 2009, 2010, 2011, 2012, and 2013.
 Won the regular season title in 1985, 1988, 1989, 1990, 2008 (shared), 2009, and 2010. 
 Won the Missouri Valley Conference tournament in 1983, 1989, 2005,2008 and 2022.

Postseason results

NCAA Division I

AIAW Division I
The Redbirds made three appearances in the AIAW National Division I basketball tournament, with a combined record of 2–5.

References

External links